USS West Point has been the name of more than one United States Navy ship, and may refer to: 

 , a cargo ship in commission from 1918 to 1919
 , a troop transport in commission from 1941 to 1946

United States Navy ship names